Events in the year 1830 in Mexico.

Incumbents 

 Anastasio Bustamante – President of Mexico during all of 1830

Governors
 Chiapas: Joaquín Miguel Gutiérrez/José Ignacio Gutiérrez
 Chihuahua: 
 Coahuila: José María Viesca/Ramón Músquiz
 Durango:  
 Guanajuato: 
 Guerrero: 
 Jalisco: José Ignacio Cañedo y Arróniz/José Ignacio Herrera y Cairo/Ramón Navarro/Juan Nepomuceno Cumplido/José Ignacio Cañedo y Arróniz/José Ignacio Herrera y Cairo
 State of Mexico:  
 Michoacán: 
 Nuevo León: Joaquín García
 Oaxaca: 
 Puebla: 
 Querétaro: Ramón Covarrubias/Manuel López de Ecala 
 San Luis Potosí: 
 Sinaloa: 
 Sonora: 
 Tabasco: 
 Tamaulipas: Francisco Vital Fernandez/Enrique Camilo Suarez/Jose Manuel Zozaya/Enrique Camilo Suarez/Jose Manuel Zozaya/Juan Guerra	 
 Veracruz: Sebastián Camacho Castilla/Antonio López de Santa Anna
 Yucatán: 
 Zacatecas:

Events

 April 6 – The Law of April 6, 1830 was passed encouraging Mexican settlement and forbidding American settlement within Coahuila y Tejas

Notable births
 September 15 – Porfirio Díaz, 29th President of Mexico (d. 1915 in France)

Notable deaths

 March 27 – Luis Antonio Argüello former governor of Alta California died in San Francisco
 April 8 – José María Estudillo an early settler and leader of San Diego
 April 22 – Miguel Domínguez former head of the Supreme Executive Power transitional government died in Mexico City

Unknown dates
 Magin Catalá – Franciscan missionary in Santa Clara, California

 
Mexico
Years of the 19th century in Mexico